Eric XIV (13 December 153326 February 1577) was King of Sweden from 1560 until he was deposed in 1569. Eric XIV was the eldest son of Gustav I (1496–1560) and Catherine of Saxe-Lauenburg (1513–1535). He was also ruler of Estonia, after its conquest by Sweden in 1561.

While he has been regarded as intelligent and artistically skilled, as well as politically ambitious, early in his reign he showed signs of mental instability, a condition that eventually led to insanity. Some scholars claim that his illness began early during his reign, while others believe that it first manifested with the Sture murders.

Eric, having been deposed and imprisoned, was most likely murdered. An examination of his remains in 1958 confirmed that he probably died of arsenic poisoning.

Early years

Eric XIV was born at Tre Kronor castle, the morning of 13 December 1533.  His mother died before his second year. In 1536, his father, Gustav Vasa, married Margaret Leijonhufvud (1516–1551), a Swedish noblewoman.

Eric's first teacher was the learned German Georg Norman, whose services were shortly thereafter needed elsewhere within the Swedish state. He was replaced by French Calvinist Dionysius Beurraeus (1500–67). Dionysius taught both Eric and his half-brother John, and seems to have been appreciated by both. Eric was very successful in foreign languages and mathematics. He was also an informed historian, a good writer and familiar with astrology.

When Eric started to appear in public, he was referred to as "chosen king" and after the meeting of parliament in Stockholm in 1560, he received the title of "hereditary king".
In 1557, Eric was assigned the fiefdoms of Kalmar, Kronoberg and Öland. He took up residence in the city of Kalmar.

Against his father's wishes, Eric entered into marriage negotiations with the future Queen Elizabeth I of England and pursued her for several years. Tensions between Eric and his father grew. Eric also made unsuccessful marriage proposals to, among others, Mary, Queen of Scots (1542–1587), Renata of Lorraine (1544–1602), Anna of Saxony (1544–1577) and Christine of Hesse (1543–1604).

Rule
The news of his father's death reached Eric as he was on the point of embarking for England to press his suit for the hand of Queen Elizabeth. Back in Stockholm he summoned a Riksdag, which met at Arboga on 15 April 1561. There he adopted the royal propositions known as the "Arboga articles", considerably curtailing the authority of the royal dukes, John and Charles, in their respective provinces.
He was crowned as Eric XIV, but was not necessarily the 14th king of Sweden named Eric. He and his brother Charles adopted regnal numbers according to Johannes Magnus's partly fictitious history of Sweden. There had, however, been at least six earlier Swedish kings with the name of Eric, as well as pretenders about whom very little is known.

From the start of his reign, Eric was in opposition to the Swedish nobility. He chose as a close adviser Göran Persson (1530–68), who had narrowly escaped execution under Eric's father. Persson was also opposed to the nobility and a determined opponent of Eric's half-brother, later John III of Sweden (1537–92). John was the Duke of Finland and was married to a Polish princess, against Eric's wishes, which made him friendly with Poland. John pursued an expansionist policy in Livonia (now Estonia and Latvia), in breach of the Arboga articles, which led to contention between the brothers. In 1563, John was seized by an army sent to Finland, and tried for high treason by Eric's order.

Unlike his father, who had been satisfied with ruling an independent state, Eric tried to expand his influence in the Baltic region and in Estonia, beginning the process that resulted in Sweden becoming a great power in the 17th century. This expansionism resulted in a clash with his cousin, Frederick II of Denmark-Norway (1534–88). Most of Eric XIV's reign was then dominated by the Livonian War and the Scandinavian Seven Years' War against Denmark-Norway (1563–70), during which he successfully repelled most Danish-Norwegian attempts at conquest, but was unable to keep his own acquisitions.From 1563 onwards, his insanity became pronounced; his rule became even more arbitrary and marked by violence. His suspicion of the nobility led him to suspicions of the Sture family, then headed by Svante Stensson Sture, who was married to Gustav's sister-in-law. He first acted against the family in 1566, accusing Svante's son Nils of treason, but commuted the sentence and instead sent Nils to Lorraine, supposedly to arrange a marriage with the princess Renata. However, Eric had determined to marry his mistress Karin Månsdotter and in 1567, on Nils's return and suspicious of high treason, he killed several members of the family in the so-called Sture Murders, Eric himself stabbing Nils Svantesson Sture. The King probably thought of the killing as an execution rather than murder.

Downfall

After the Sture homicides, John was imprisoned and Eric's conflict with the nobility came to its climax. Early in 1568, Eric seemed to recover his reason, and attempted to reconcile with John on the condition that the latter recognized Eric's marriage with Karin Månsdotter. This marriage was solemnized in July, Karin crowned Queen, and their infant son Gustav pronounced Prince-royal. However, in the fall of 1568, asserting Eric's insanity, the dukes and the nobles rebelled, and after some resistance, Eric was imprisoned by his brother Duke John, who took power on 30 September. Jöran Persson was assigned much of the blame for the actions directed against the nobility during Eric XIV's reign and was executed shortly after John III had incarcerated Eric, who was legally dethroned in January 1569 by the Riksdag.

Imprisonment and death

For the next seven years the ex-king was a source of anxiety to the new government. Three rebellions - the 1569 Plot, the Mornay Plot and the 1576 Plot - with the object of releasing and reinstating him, had to be suppressed, and Eric was held as a prisoner in many different castles in both Sweden and Finland. He died in prison in Örbyhus Castle. According to a tradition starting with Johannes Messenius, his final meal was a poisoned bowl of pea soup. A document signed by his brother, John III of Sweden, and a nobleman, Bengt Bengtsson Gylta (1514–74), gave Eric's guards in his last prison authorization to poison him if anyone tried to release him. His body was later exhumed and modern forensic analysis revealed evidence of lethal arsenic poisoning.

Family and descendants

Eric XIV had several relationships before his marriage.

With Agda Persdotter:

Virginia Eriksdotter (1559–1633; living descendants)
Constantia Eriksdotter (1560–1649; living descendants)
Lucretia Eriksdotter (1564–after 1574) died young.

With Karin Jacobsdotter:
An unnamed child, died April 1565.

Eric XIV finally married Karin Månsdotter (1550–1612) on 4 July 1568; their children were:
 Sigrid (1566–1633; born before the marriage), lady-in-waiting, wife of two noblemen.
 Gustaf (1568–1607; born before the marriage), mercenary 
Henrik (1570–74)
Arnold (1572–73)

Eric XIV in literature

The life of Eric XIV is the subject of an 1899 play by Swedish playwright August Strindberg (1849–1912). The love story of Eric XIV and Karin Månsdotter is the subject of a 1942 historical novel Karin Månsdotter by Mika Waltari.

See also

List of Swedish monarchs
List of Finnish monarchs and Heads of State
History of Sweden
History of Sweden (1523–1611)

References

External links 

Biography of Eric XIV of Sweden
 
 https://www.adelsvapen.com/genealogi/Vasa

1533 births
1577 deaths
Dethroned monarchs
16th-century Swedish monarchs
People from Stockholm
Rulers of Finland
House of Vasa
16th-century murdered monarchs
Royalty and nobility with disabilities
People of the Northern Seven Years' War
People murdered in Sweden
Sons of kings
Deaths from arsenic poisoning
Murder in 1577